Amirabad (also Romanized as Amīrābād; also known as Amīrābād-e Pā’īn and Amīrābād-e Soflá) is a village in Esmaili Rural District, Esmaili District, Anbarabad County, Kerman Province, Iran. At the 2006 census, its population was 101, in 23 families.

References 

Populated places in Anbarabad County